The 2021–22 season was the 54th season in the existence of Trabzonspor, all coming in the top flight of Turkish football. In addition to the domestic league, Trabzonspor participated in this season's edition of the Turkish Cup and competed in the inaugural UEFA Europa Conference League.

On 30 April 2022, Trabzonspor were crowned Turkish league champions for the first time in 38 years, clinching the title with a 2–2 draw against Antalyaspor.

Players

Current squad

Out on loan

Transfers

In

Out

 Ongoing contract terminated, new contract made with same terms and conditions effective next season.

Pre-season and friendlies

Competitions

Overall record

Süper Lig

League table

Results summary

Results by matchday

Matches

Turkish Cup

UEFA Europa Conference League

Third qualifying round
The draw for the third qualifying round was held on 19 July 2021.

Play-off round
The draw for the play-off round was held on 2 August 2021.

Statistics

Squad statistics

References

Trabzonspor seasons
Trabzonspor
2021–22 UEFA Europa Conference League participants seasons
Turkish football championship-winning seasons